William Beamont (1797–1889) was an English mayor, solicitor and philanthropist.

William Beamont may also refer to:

William John Beamont (1828–1868), English clergyman and author

See also
William Beaumont (disambiguation)
Beamont (surname)